Science as a Vocation (German: Wissenschaft als Beruf) is the text of a lecture given in 1917 at Munich University by German sociologist and political economist Max Weber. The original version was published in German, but at least two translations in English exist. Science as a Vocation is the first of the two "Vocation" lectures Weber delivered.  The second lecture was "Politics as a Vocation" which was delivered in January 1919, also in Munich.

Summary
In Science as a Vocation, Weber weighed the benefits and detriments of choosing a career as an academic at a university who studies science or humanities.  Weber probes the question "what is the value of science?" and focuses on the nature of ethics underpinning the scientific career.   Science, to Weber, gives methods of explanation and means of justifying a position, but it cannot explain why that position is worth holding in the first place; this is the task of philosophy. No science is free from suppositions, and the value of a science is lost when its suppositions are rejected.

At one point in the lecture, Weber compares the nature of an artist's work to that of a scientist. He argues that the artist's work can reach fulfillment; the scientist's work, on the other hand, by its very nature, is designed to be surpassed.

Weber reasons that science can never answer the fundamental questions of life, such as directing people on how to live their lives and what to value. Value, he contends, can only be derived from personal beliefs such as religion. He further argues for the separation of reason and faith, noting that each has its place in its respective field but, if crossed over, cannot work.

Weber also separates fact from value in politics. He argues that a teacher should impart knowledge to students and teach them how to clarify issues logically – even political issues – but teachers should never use the classroom to indoctrinate or preach their personal political views.

Weber also makes some practical comments about research and teaching. He notes that good scholars can be poor teachers, and that qualities that make one a good scholar, or a good thinker, are not necessarily the same qualities that make for good leaders or role models.

Dating
There has been some debate about when Weber delivered this lecture. Older sources often give the year as 1918. But based on a range of evidence scholars now think that Weber gave these lectures in 1917.

Translations
Weber, Max (1946). Science as Vocation, in From Max Weber, tr. and ed. by H. H. Gerth, and C. Wright Mills. New York: Free press.

Weber, Max (2004). Science as Vocation, in The Vocation Lectures, tr. by Rodney Livingstone, and Edited by David Owen and Tracy Strong (Illinois: Hackett Books).

References

External links

 Original text Wissenschaft als Beruf at German Wikisource
 Online ebook of Science as a Vocation
 Wissenschaft als Beruf: online eBook

Sociology essays
Essays by Max Weber
Ludwig Maximilian University of Munich
1917 speeches
1917 essays